Milesia anthrax is a species of hoverfly in the family Syrphidae.

Distribution
Borneo.

References

Insects described in 1990
Eristalinae
Diptera of Asia